The Small Club World Cup was a football tournament held in Venezuela between 1952 and 1975 (with some journalists considering 1952–57 the period of greatest relevance, and the second period that took place between 1963 and 1975 as of minor relevance). In most of the occasions, the competition was played by four participants from Europe and South America. In the first period, clubs from three countries would win the tournament: Spain, Brazil and Colombia. Five clubs have won the trophy in this period: Real Madrid, Sao Paulo, Millonarios, Corinthians, and Barcelona.

When the Europeans Champions Clubs' Cup was started in 1955, the Venezuelan competition lost importance and was discontinued in 1957. Although the tournament was relaunched in 1963, its relevance decreased as the Intercontinental Cup (first held in 1960) was then established as the major, official intercontinental competition for both South American and European clubs. During the 1963–75 period, the trophy was also named "Copa Ciudad de Caracas".

This competition is considered by some journalists as a predecessor of Intercontinental Cup, in that it regularly featured clubs from Europe and South America. However, there has come to light no 1952–1960 original source indicating that it had any influence for the creation of the Intercontinental Cup, or that it was effectively hailed in 1952–1957 as a club world trophy. Nevertheless, some clubs like Real Madrid highlight this trophy in their history or trophy section of their web-sites and publications.

List of champions 

Notes

Titles by country

Performances by continent

References 

Small Club World Cup
s
s
s